The Judy and Jim Show is a Canadian variety television miniseries which aired on CBC Television as separate runs in 1973 and 1977.

Premise
This Vancouver-produced series featured sibling vocalists Judy Ginn and Jim Walchuk, leading a mix of comedy and music material with an emphasis on Ukrainian culture. Its 1973 run was three episodes, part of a block of mid-season variety programming originating from various Canadian cities. Bobby Hales was the series music director and house band leader, supported by musical trio Pat Hervey, Joani Taylor and Michael Vincent.

A second run of seven episodes was broadcast in 1977, also produced in Vancouver. Juliette appeared on 9 September 1977 broadcast with the Cheremshyna Ukrainian Dancers.

Scheduling
The first half-hour miniseries was broadcast on Mondays at 7:30 p.m. (Eastern time) from 6 to 20 August 1973.

The second series was broadcast Fridays at 7:30 p.m. from 29 July to 16 September 1977, also a half-hour timeslot, totalling seven episodes (19 August 1977 time slot was pre-empted for a Canada Games report).

See also
 Points East, Points West (1976, in which Ginn and Walchuk performed)

References

External links
 

CBC Television original programming
1973 Canadian television series debuts
1977 Canadian television series endings
1970s Canadian variety television series
Television shows filmed in Vancouver